Beyond Tomorrow may refer to:

Beyond Tomorrow (TV series), an Australian documentary series
Beyond Tomorrow (film), a 1940 film starring Harry Carey
Beyond Tomorrow (radio series), a 1950s American radio program
"Beyond Tomorrow" (song), a song by Perry Como